The Cyprus Air Command, is the armed air wing of the National Guard. This force is equipped with attack and anti-tank helicopters, surface-to-air missile systems and integrated radar systems.

History 
The history of Cypriot aviation began on 16 August 1960, after it won its independence from the United Kingdom, when an Air Wing was established on the island which. It was equipped with a small number of light aircraft and mainly performed search and rescue tasks (SAR), transport of the sick, control of fires and marine pollution as well as defense and police forces on the Cypriot coast and territory.

Until 1987, the aircraft of the Cypriot aviation still operated with brands civilians, as the usual military nature of the young air force had not yet developed. In the same year, 3  light helicopters Bell 206, 4 utility helicopters Aérospatiale Gazelle and 2  intermediate trainers Pilatus PC-9.

From this moment on, the Cypriot air force began to adopt for its aircraft a camouflage livery and nationality insignia with the national flag and the classic cockade that perfectly follows that of Greece, the nation with which it exists a strong bond, not only military.

In July 2022, the Cypriot government announced that six Eurocopter EC145 helicopters would be procured from Airbus with an option for six more. These helicopters would cover the roles of reconnaissance and attack. They will be replacing the ageing Mil Mi-24 helicopters in service which are hard and costly to maintain. Turkish Cypriot authorities have called the helicopter purchase as a “provocation”.

Organisation 
The Cyprus Air Force consists of two aircraft squadrons. 
Note that the aircraft of the Cyprus Police operate under a separate command-structure during peacetime.

 450th Attack Helicopter Squadron (450 M.E/P)
 460th Search And Rescue Squadron (460 MED)

Air Force bases and stations 
 Andreas Papandreou AFB, Paphos (ACTIVE)
The primary airbase of the Cyprus Air Force, this base adjacent to the Paphos International Airport has a runway, taxiway, hardened aircraft-shelters, and integrated command, control and communication facilities.

 Lakatamia AFB, Nicosia (HEADQUARTERS)
The reserve airbase of the Cyprus Air Force lay just south of the Cypriot capital of Nicosia. The base rarely hosted fixed-wing aircraft, and simply served as a staging-post for helicopters operating in and out of the Nicosia area.

 Troodos Stations (ACTIVE)
The Troodos Mountains, the highest mountain range in Cyprus, hosts a number of radar and air-defense facilities. Their unit designations and deployment status are not made public.

Equipment

Aircraft

Air Defense

Aerial incidents between Cyprus and Turkey

Paphos Incident – 22 October 2000 
On 22 October 2000, TOR-M1 air-defense batteries operated by the Cyprus National Guard at Papandreou Air Base tracked a pair of Turkish warplanes detected approaching the airbase by "locking-on" to them.
By Jean Christou, Cyprus Mail, 7 April 2002. The action of engaging the Turkish aircraft with radar forced the warplanes to retreat from the area, as Greek Cypriot and Greek forces conducted joint military maneuvers in the Paphos region. The incident prompted an angry outburst from the Turkish Cypriot leader, Rauf Denktaş, who was reported in the media to have condemned the radar lock-on as a provocation that could lead to war.

Paphos Incident – 5 April 2002 
It was variously reported in the Cyprus media that combat radars of the Cyprus National Guard, based at Papandreou Air Base in Paphos, had tracked two Turkish F-16 warplanes at 11am on 5 April 2002, by "locking-on" to them. The two Turkish aircraft were reported to have incurred into the Nicosia Flight Information Region and then passed directly over the Greek Cypriot airbase at an altitude of 3500 feet. Upon realizing that they were being tracked, the two Turkish aircraft turned back towards Turkey, and then returned to their airbase.

Cyprus EEZ - 18 August 2022 
On 18 August 2022, Cypriot and Greek radars spotted a Turkish Navy ATR 72 whilst flying over Block 6 of the exclusive economic zone of Cyprus. According to media sources, the plane did a low pass at 4,500 feet, however a Cypriot official claimed that the plane did no such thing and remained at 29,000.

See also 
 Armoured vehicles of the Cypriot National Guard
 Cypriot National Guard
 Cyprus Joint Rescue Coordination Center
 List of equipment of the Cypriot National Guard

References

Sources 
 Cyprus National Guard Official website (Air Force section – in Greek)
 Cyprus Air Force
 Cyprus National Guard, Air Force Command
 Tom Cooper "Cyprus, 1955–1973", ACIG Journal
 Tom Cooper & Nicholas Tselepidis "Cyprus 1974", ACIG Journal
 Dirk Jan de Ridder "Cypriot Gunships", Ridder.aero
 Air Defence of Cyprus (in Greek)

Air Forces
Air
Air forces by country